Debby P. Sanderson (born September 28, 1941) is a former Republican member of the Florida House of Representatives and the Florida Senate. She was the first Republican woman elected to the House of Representatives from Broward County. She retired from the State Senate in 2002 after redistricting.

References

External links
Project Vote Smart – Representative Debby P. Sanderson (FL) profile
Our Campaigns – Debby P. Sanderson (FL) profile
Florida House of Representatives - Debby P. Sanderson
Florida State Senate - Debby P. Sanderson

|-

|-

Living people
Florida Atlantic University alumni
Broward College alumni
1941 births
Republican Party Florida state senators
Republican Party members of the Florida House of Representatives
Women state legislators in Florida
21st-century American women
People from Stratford, Connecticut